Jacques Paul Migne (25 October 1800 – 24 October 1875) was a French priest who published inexpensive and widely distributed editions of theological works, encyclopedias, and the texts of the Church Fathers, with the goal of providing a universal library for the Catholic priesthood.

The Patrologia Latina and the Patrologia Graeca (along with the Monumenta Germaniae Historica) are among the great 19th century contributions to the scholarship of patristics and the Middle Ages. Within the Roman Catholic Church, Migne's editions put many original texts for the first time into the hands of the priesthood.

Biography
Migne was born in Saint-Flour, Cantal and studied theology at the University of Orléans.  He was ordained in 1824 and placed in charge of the parish of Puiseaux, in the diocese of Orléans, where his uncompromisingly Catholic and royalist sympathies did not coincide with local patriotism and the new regime of the Citizen-King. In 1833, after falling out with his bishop over a pamphlet he had published, he went to Paris, and on 3 November started a journal, L'Univers religieux, which he intended to keep free of political influence. It quickly gained 1,800 subscribers and he edited it for three years. (It afterwards became his co-editor Louis Veuillot's ultramontane organ, L'Univers.) Migne was, until June 1856, owner of the daily Vérité (formerly the Journal des faits), which, being limited to reproducing other newspapers, described itself as the impartial echo of all opinions.

Migne believed in the power of the press and the value of information widely distributed. In 1836 he opened his great publishing house, the Ateliers catholiques, at Petit-Montrouge, in Paris's outlying 14th arrondissement. He published numerous religious works in rapid succession meant for lesser clergy at prices that ensured wide circulation, and bypassed the bookselling establishment with direct subscriptions. 
These works were reproduced from the best available texts, generally without requesting permission. His publishing house was complemented during the Second Empire by painter artists' workhalls for the decoration of churches: three of their main works, in the style of Eugène Delacroix, still remain in the choir of the church of Saint John the Baptist of Audresselles in Pas de Calais, France. The Ateliers also produced and sold a variety of religious items.

In time, the Ateliers catholiques became the largest privately held press in France. However, on the night of 12–13 February 1868, a devastating fire, which began in the printing plant, destroyed Migne's establishment. "Five hundred thousand plates, stacked in piles, melted in an instant; they are now enormous blocks on the most bizarre forms," reported Le Monde illustré. Despite his insurance contracts, Migne was only able to retrieve a pittance.

Shortly afterwards Mgr Georges Darboy, Archbishop of Paris, forbade the continuance of the business and even suspended him from his priestly functions. The Franco-Prussian War of 1870 inflicted further losses. Then from the curia of Pope Pius IX came a decree condemning the use of Mass stipends to purchase books, which specifically called out Migne and his publications.

Migne died in Paris. He died without ever regaining his former success and his Imprimerie Catholique passed in 1876 into the hands of Garnier Frères.

A complete edition of patrology
The best known of his publications are: Scripturae sacrae cursus completus ("complete course in sacred scripture") which assembled a wide repertory of commentaries on each of the books of the Bible, and Theologiae cursus, each of them in 28 vols, 1840–45; Collection des auteurs sacrés (100 vols., 1846–48); Encyclopédie théologique (171 vols., 1844–46).

However, the three great series that have made his reputation were Patrologiae cursus completus, Latin series (Patrologia Latina) in 221 vols. (1844–55); Greek series (Patrologia Graeca), first published in Latin (85 vols., 1856–57); then published with Greek text and Latin translation (165 vols., 1857–58). Though scholars have always criticised them, these hastily edited, inexpensive, and widely distributed texts have only slowly been replaced during a century and a half with more critically edited modern editions. The cheap paper of the originals has made them fragile today, but the scope of the Patrologia still makes it unique and valuable when modern editions do not yet exist. It is a far more complete collection of Patristic and later literature than anything that has appeared subsequently. To create so much so quickly, Migne reprinted the best or latest earlier editions available to him.  In the PG the Latin translations were often made in the renaissance before any Greek text had been printed, and so do not necessarily match the Greek text very accurately. The indexes themselves are useful for locating references in the patristic writings.

The collection is available through Google Books and archive.org.

Summary of publications
Migne's Ateliers catholiques employed 5 steam-powered presses, and by 1854 some 596 workers. On average, it published a book every ten days for thirty years. In summary these were:
 Patrologia Latina, 217 tomes in 218 volumes
 Patrologia Graeca, 161 tomes in 166 volumes
 Greek Fathers in Latin, 81 tomes in 85 volumes
 Scripturae sacrae cursus completus, 25 volumes
 Theologia cursus completus, 25 volumes
 Démonstration évangeliques des plus célèbres défenseurs du Christianisme, 18 volumes
 Orateurs sacrés in two series, 66 and 33 volumes
 Première encyclopédie théologique ou série de dictionnaires sur toutes les parties de la science religieuse, 50 volumes
 Nouvelle encyclopédie théologique, 53 volumes
 Troisième et dernière encylopédie ecclésiastique, 66 volumes
 Summa aurea de laudibus B. Mariae virginis, 13 volumes

References

External links
 
 Brief biography independent research (in French)
 Migne Patrologia Graeca Index of Authors / Download links
 Faulkner University Patristics Project A growing collection of English translations of patristic texts and high-resolution scans from the comprehensive Patrologia compiled by J. P. Migne.
 Documenta Catholica Omnia PDF's of much of the Patrologia Latina
 Polytonic Greek OCR of PG from the Lace repository at Mount Allison University: vol. 45,  vol. 46
 
 
 Patrologia Graeca - patristica.net
 Adalbert Hamman, "Un grand éditeur du XIXe siècle", Le Monde, 7 January 1975
 L'abbé Jacques-Paul Migne - website on life and works of Migne

1800 births
1875 deaths
People from Cantal
Catholic education
Christian scholars
Hellenists
French Latinists
Patrologists
French editors
19th-century French Roman Catholic priests
French male non-fiction writers